Nowon Madeul Stadium is a multi-purpose stadium in Nowon District, Seoul, South Korea.

External links

Football venues in South Korea
Sports venues completed in 2008
Sports venues in Seoul
Seoul Nowon United FC